The list of ship launches in 1732 includes a chronological list of some ships launched in 1732.


References

1732
Ship launches